Ursula may refer to:

 Ursula (name), feminine name and a list of people and fictional characters with the name
Ursula (album), an album by American jazz pianist Mal Waldron
Ursula (crater), a crater on Titania, a moon of Uranus
Ursula (detention center), processing facility for unaccompanied minors in McAllen, Texas
Ursula (The Little Mermaid), a fictional character who appears in The Little Mermaid (1989)
Ursula Channel, body of water in British Columbia, Canada
375 Ursula, a large main-belt asteroid
HMS Ursula, a destroyer and two submarines that served with the Royal Navy
Tropical Storm Ursula (disambiguation), a typhoon, two cyclones, and a tropical depression, all in the Pacific Ocean

See also
Saint Ursula
Urszula